Broghil Valley National Park is located in the upper northern reaches of the Chitral District, Khyber Pakhtunkhwa, Pakistan, close to the Afghan-Pakistan border.

Geography 

Broghil valley borders on the Afghan Wakhan corridor, which stretches between Tajikistan and Pakistan.

The area is mostly mountainous. The terrain is undulating with mountains, grassy plains, and valleys. It includes almost 3,400 ha of peatlands and lakes. The valley features around 30 freshwater lakes and is surrounded by glaciers and mountains.

Tourism
The Broghil valley’s remote location makes it a hard-to-reach tourist destination. Many communities in Broghil lack access to basic facilities and services. The annual Broghil Festival attracts visitors, however it lacks basic road and hospitality infrastructure. Attendees enjoy attractions and activities such as yak polo and exhibitions of woolen handicrafts, accompanied by traditional food and music.

Flora and Fauna
Spread across the grassy plains are scrubs and Common plants include Webb's rose, Artemisia brevifolia, and Artemisia maritima. The forests are mainly dominated by Juniperus species and Betula . 23 mammals, 120 birds, 3 reptiles, and 1 amphibian species have been confirmed.

Mammals 
Siberian ibex, C.s.sakeen
Bharal, P.n.nayaur
Marco Polo sheep, O.a.polii
Himalayan musk deer, M.leucogaster
Persian leopard, P.p.saxicolor
Snow leopard, P.uncia
Turkestan lynx, L.l.isabellinus
Leopard cat, P.b.bengalensis
Himalayan wolf, C.l.chanco
Golden jackal, C.a.indica
Red fox, V.v.montana
Himalayan brown bear, U.t.isabellinus
Long-tailed marmot, M.c.aurea
Pale gray shrew, C.pergisea

Himalayan birds 
Chukar partridge, Alectoris chukar
Snow partridge, Lerwalerwa
Himalayan snowcock, Tetrogallus himalayanus
Golden eagle, Aquila chrysaetos daphanea
Bearded vulture, Gypaetus barbatus
Snow pigeon, Columba leuconota

Herpeto-fauna 
Chitral gecko, Cyrtodactylus walli
Plump banded gecko, Cyrtodactylus dattanensis
Caucasian agama, Paralaudakia caucasia
Baltistan toad, Bufo latastii

See also
Broghol Pass
Chikaar
Darkot Pass
Karambar Lake
List of valleys in Pakistan

References

External links
Broghil Valley

 Chitral District
 Protected areas of Khyber Pakhtunkhwa
 Valleys of Khyber Pakhtunkhwa
 Parks in Khyber Pakhtunkhwa